Athlete Refugee Team is the category under which refugees' athletes can compete at international IAAF competitions. Official IAAF logo is used as the team's flag.

They competed at the 2017 World Championships in Athletics, 2017 IAAF World Relays, 2018 IAAF World U20 Championships and 2019 World Athletics Championships.

One athlete (Puok Thiep Gatkuoth in men's marathon) was announced to compete at the 2018 European Athletics Championships, but did not start.

Competition history

Olympic Games

World Championships

World Indoor Championships

World Relay Championships

World Half Marathon Championships

World Cross Country Championships

Continental Championships

Continental Indoor Championships

Age group events

Other events

See also
Authorised Neutral Athletes

References

Independent athletes
Refugees
World Athletics
National athletics teams
European Athletics Championships